The California Department of Corrections and Rehabilitation (CDCR) is the penal law enforcement agency of the government of California responsible for the operation of the California state prison and parole systems. Its headquarters are in Sacramento.

Staff size 
CDCR is the 3rd largest law enforcement agency in the United States behind the U.S. Customs and Border Protection (CBP) 
which is an arm of Dept of Homeland Security (DHS), and the New York City Police Department, which employ approximately 66,000 federal officers and 42,000 police officers respectively. CDCR correctional officers are sworn law enforcement officers with peace officer powers.

As of 2013, CDCR employed approximately 24,000 peace officers (state correctional officers), 1,800 state parole agents, and 150 criminal investigators.

Kathleen Allison was appointed by Governor Gavin Newsom as Secretary for the California Department of Corrections and Rehabilitation (CDCR) on October 1, 2020.

History
In 1851, California activated its first state-run institution. This institution was a 268-ton wooden ship named The Waban, and was anchored in the San Francisco Bay. The prison ship housed 30 inmates who subsequently constructed San Quentin State Prison, which opened in 1852 with approximately 68 inmates.

Since 1852, the Department has activated thirty-one prisons across the state. CDCR's history dates back to 1912, when the agency was called California State Detentions Bureau. In 1951 it was renamed California Department of Corrections. In 2004 it was renamed California Department of Corrections and Rehabilitation.

In 2018-2019 it cost an average of $81,203 to house an inmate for one year.

Reorganization (2000s)

In 2004, a Corrections Independent Review Panel suggested "Reorganizing the Youth and Adult Correctional Agency".  The Agency had consisted of "the Department of Corrections, the Department of the Youth Authority, the Board of Prison Terms, the Board of Corrections, the Commission on Correctional Peace Officer Standards and Training, the Narcotic Addict Evaluation Board and the Youth Authority Board."

California Governor Arnold Schwarzenegger made a reorganization plan public in January 2005 implementing many of the recommendations of the panel but without "a citizens commission overseeing the state's entire correctional operation." The reorganization became effective on July 1, 2005. The CDCR superseded the:

Organization

Divisions and boards
 California Adult Operations Division
 California Adult Parole Division
 California Adult Programs Division
 California Board of Parole Hearings
 California Council on Mentally Ill Offenders (COMIO)
 California Corrections Standards Authority
California Division of Juvenile Justice
 CPHCS Contract Branch
 Prison Industry Authority (CALPIA)
 State Commission on Juvenile Justice
 Division of Rehabilitative Programs (DRP)
California Correctional Health Care Services (CCHCS)

Facilities

CDCR operates all state institutions, oversees a variety of community correctional facilities and camps, and monitors all parolees during their entry back into society.

Institutions
According to the Department's official Web site, "Currently there are 33 adult correctional institutions, 13 adult community correctional facilities, and eight juvenile facilities in California that house more than 165,000 adult offenders and nearly 3,200 juvenile offenders." This inmate population makes the CDCR the largest state-run prison system in the United States.<ref name=MooreNYT>Moore, Solomon. [https://www.nytimes.com/2007/07/24/us/24calif.html New Court to Address California Prison Crowding"]. The New York Times, July 24, 2007.</ref>

Regarding adult prisons, CDCR has the task of receiving and housing inmates that were convicted of felony crimes within the State of California. Adult inmates arriving at a state prison are assigned a classification based on the offense committed. Each prison is designed to house different varieties of inmate offenders, from Level I inmates to Level IV inmates; the higher the level, the higher risk the inmate poses. Selected prisons within the state are equipped with security housing units, reception centers, and/or "condemned" units.  These security levels are defined as follows:

 Level I: "Open dormitories without a secure perimeter."
 Level II: "Open dormitories with secure perimeter fences and armed coverage."
 Level III: "Individual cells, fenced perimeters and armed coverage."
 Level IV: "Cells, fenced or walled perimeters, electronic security, more staff and armed officers both inside and outside the installation."
 Security Housing Unit (SHU): "The most secure area within a Level IV prison designed to provide maximum coverage."  These are designed to handle inmates who cannot be housed with the general population of inmates. This includes inmates who are validated prison gang members, gang bosses or shot callers, etc.
 Reception Center (RC): "Provides short term housing to process, classify and evaluate incoming inmates."
 Condemned (Cond): "Holds inmates with death sentences."

Death Row

Condemned male prisoners are held at San Quentin State Prison. Condemned female prisoners are held at the Central California Women's Facility. Executions take place at San Quentin. The State of California took full control of capital punishment in 1891. Originally, executions took place at San Quentin and at Folsom State Prison. Folsom's last execution occurred on December 3, 1937. In previous eras the California Institution for Women housed the death row for women.

In the mid 2000, LAPD arrested a young man Juan Catalan after a little girl was shot dead. Catalan was sentenced to death after a witness stated that he looked like the killer. Catalan turned out to be innocent; it was a documentary (Curb your enthusiasm) which showed him seated a Los Angeles Dodgers baseball game, thus exonerating him.   

Parole
According to the Department's official Web site, "there are more than 148,000 adult parolees and 3,800 juvenile parolees supervised by the CDCR." A 2002 article found that "California's growth in the numbers of people on parole supervision—and in the numbers whose parole has been revoked—has far exceeded the growth in the rest of the nation." California accounted for 12 percent of the U.S. population but 18% of the U.S. parole population, and almost 90,000 California parolees returned to prison in 2000. 
At San Quentin, the non-profit organization California Reentry Program "helps inmates re-enter society after they serve their sentences."

CDCR Peace Officers

Correctional Officers and Parole Agents are sworn Peace Officers per California Penal code sections 830.5, as their primary duties are to provide public safety and correctional services in and outside of state prison grounds, state-operated medical facilities, and camps while engaged in the performance of their duties.

The primary duties of these officers include, but are not limited to, providing public safety and law enforcement services in and around California's adult and youth institutions, fire camps, and state-operated medical facilities and hospitals, and community correctional facilities. These officers also monitor and supervise parolees who are released back into the general public. Other primary duties include investigation and apprehension of institutional escapees and parolees at large (PAL), prison gangs, statewide narcotics enforcement and investigations (involving institutions), etc.

Agents of the Office of Correctional Safety (OCS) are peace officers per California Penal Code 830.2 whether assigned to the Special Service Unit (Special Agents), the Fugitive Apprehension Team (Special Agents, PAI, II & IIIs), or other entity of OCS, which serves are the special operations division of the department. OCS Agents are classified as full time peace officers.

Correctional Peace Officer Academy
CDCR Peace Officers are trained to become Sworn Peace Officers of the State of California at the Basic Correctional Peace Officer Academy located in Galt, California. Cadets must complete a 13-week formal and comprehensive training program. The curriculum consists of 640 hours (four months) of training. Instruction includes but is not limited to firearms, chemical agents, non-lethal impact weapons, arrest and control techniques, state law, penal codes and department policies and procedures.

Cadets must also successfully complete the Peace Officer Standards and Training (POST) minimum requirement course. Upon completion of the academy, cadets are sworn in as CDCR peace officers. Upon assignment to their work institution or location, these officers also undergo further training for two years as vocational apprentices (one year of which is spent on probation). Upon completion of their two-year training they are then considered regular state correctional peace officers (CDCR officers)

Rank structure
 

 Specialized Units 

 Fugitive Apprehension Team 

An elite and low-profile unit within CDCR is the Fugitive Apprehension Team or FAT which is made up of just over eighty agents who are assigned to offices throughout the state. FAT agents are criminal investigators and are teamed with the Warrants Unit of the United States Marshals Service (USMS) in locating and apprehending individuals wanted for high-violence offenses, whether under the jurisdiction of CDCR or local agencies. FAT agents have full-time peace officer powers throughout the state under Penal Code Section 830.2(d) and provide services to local agencies whose resources do not allow them to pursue violent offenders who have fled their jurisdictions, to parole violators wanted for violent offenses, and individuals wanted under federal warrants. Some of the agents have powers that extend beyond the State of California as they are also sworn Special Deputies of the USMS. FAT agents are highly trained in high-risk warrant service execution and must complete a special tactical academy to become a member of the "Teams." The "Teams" take their name from the Navy SEAL program, as they are so elite and secretive. Members of these teams are kept confidential for safety and security reasons, as their nature is to conduct investigations in locating violent fugitives and executing their apprehension on a timely basis.
FAT shares a sentimental affiliation with the historic California State Rangers, who were created in May 1853 by a California Legislative Act and organized by Captain Harry Love, to apprehend dangerous offenders of the time. In August 1853, after having fulfilled their purpose, the Rangers were mustered out of service. The affiliation that FAT shares, although remotely, is that in July 1996 the California State Legislature enacted specific funds earmarked via the Department of Corrections to create fugitive teams to locate and bring to justice parole violators, the most violent offenders of modern times.

 Special Service Unit 
In addition to correctional officers, CDCR employs a small group of criminal investigators who are assigned to offices throughout the state. These investigators are part of an elite unit known as the Special Service Unit or simply SSU.  

Issues

Prison health care

There are at multiple ongoing lawsuits over medical care in the California prison system. Plata v. Brown is a federal class action civil rights lawsuit alleging unconstitutionally inadequate medical services, and as a result of a stipulation between the plaintiffs and the state, the court issued an injunction requiring defendants to provide "only the minimum level of medical care required under the Eighth Amendment." However, three years after approving the stipulation as an order of the court, the court conducted an evidentiary hearing that revealed the continued existence of appalling conditions arising from defendants’ failure to provide adequate medical care to California inmates. As a result, the court ruled in June 2005 and issued an order on October 3, 2005 putting the CDCR's medical health care delivery system in receivership, citing the "depravity" of the system. In February 2006, the judge appointed Robert Sillen to the position and Sillen was replaced by J. Clark Kelso in January 2008.Coleman v. Brown is a federal class action civil rights lawsuit alleging unconstitutionally inadequate mental health care, filed on April 23, 1990. On September 13, 1995 the court found the delivery of mental health care violated the Eighth Amendment to the United States Constitution, and issued an order for injunctive relief requiring defendants to develop plans to remedy the constitutional violations under the supervision of a special master.

Following the Governor's issuance of the State of Emergency Proclamation, the plaintiffs in Plata and Coleman filed motions to convene a three-judge court to limit the prison population. On July 23, 2007 both the Plata and Coleman'' courts granted the plaintiff's motions and recommended that the cases be assigned to the same three-judge court.

As of 2008–09 fiscal year, the state of California spent approximately $16,000 per inmate per year on prison health care. This amount was by far the largest in the country and more than triple the $4,400 spent per inmate in 2001. The state with the second largest prison population in the country, Texas, spent less than $4,000 per inmate per year.

Union: California Correctional Peace Officers Association

Officers of the department are represented by the California Correctional Peace Officers Association (the CCPOA). It was founded in 1957 and its stated goals include the protection and safety of officers, and the advocation of laws, funding and policies to improve work operations and protect public safety. The union has had its controversies over the years, including criticism of its large contributions to former California Governor Gray Davis. Since the California recall election, 2003, the CCPOA has been a vocal critic of Governor Arnold Schwarzenegger.

In June 2008, the union came under investigation from both the California Office of the Inspector General and the CDCR for its role in the hiring of a 21-year-old parolee by Minorities In Law Enforcement, an affiliate of CCPOA. Upon conclusion of investigations by both agencies, no wrongdoing was found.

See also

 List of law enforcement agencies in California

National:
 List of United States state correction agencies
 Prison–industrial complex
 Incarceration in the United States
 Critical Resistance

References

External links
 
 Crime Prevention and Corrections in the California Code of Regulations
 California Youth and Adult Corrections Authority (Archive)
 California Correctional Peace Officers Association
 California Reentry Program

Penal system in California
Government agencies established in 2005
State corrections departments of the United States
Corrections and Rehabilitation
2005 establishments in California